Sergio Rendine (Naples 7 September 1954) is an Italian composer of operas, symphonic, ballet, and chamber music.

Biography
Rendine started his musical studies at the age of five with his father, Furio Rendine (1920–1987) and his grandfather Salvatore Papaccio (1890–1977).
He was pupil of Domenico Guaccero at the Santa Cecilia Conservatory in Rome and of Giuseppe Agostini at Pesaro Conservatory.
Professor at the Conservatorio "A.Casella" in L'Aquila., he sat on the board of directors of the Accademia Nazionale di Santa Cecilia. Artistic director of the Stuttgart Festival der zeitgenössischen Musik, from 1988 to 1991, Commissioner for the opera of the SIAE from 1995 to 2000, Artistic director of the Teatro Marrucino in Chieti from 1997 to 2007 and currently Artistic director of the FOSS (Fondazione Orchestra Sinfonica Siciliana) from 2011.

His works were commissioned by BBC London, Süddeutscher Rundfunk SDR Stuttgart, Norddeutscher Rundfunk NDR Hamburg, Kölner Philharmonie, Opéra de Monte-Carlo, Teatro dell'Opera di Roma, Teatro di San Carlo di Napoli, Teatro Comunale (Bologna), Arena di Verona, Teatro alla Scala di Milano, Orchestra Sinfonica Nazionale della RAI, Salzburg Festival, Strasbourg Music Festival, Schwetzingen Festival etc.

His compositions have been performed by famous artists as Vladimir Ashkenazy, José Carreras, Carla Fracci, Lindsey Kemp, Katia Ricciarelli, Gianluigi Gelmetti, Salvatore Accardo, Richard Stoltzman, Marzio Conti
John Neschling. Together with Yoritsune Matsudaira, Gian Carlo Menotti, Krzysztof Penderecki and Alfred Schnittke, Rendine was commissioned by the Nobel Peace Prize Committee to compose the Mass for Peace, which was performed at the Nobel Peace Prize Concert in Oslo on 11 December 1995.

He won Prix Italia and Premios Ondas with "Alice" in 1987–1988.

Compositions
Rendine's compositions are published  by Casa Ricordi, Casa Sonzogno, B & W Italia (Bideri & Warner Music), and Edipan. He has composed over 200 works, including: 
Alice, "radiophonic opera" in 126 episodes based on Alice in Wonderland, 1986–1987, commissioned by RAI Radio 1 and RAI Radio 3
Hermes 594" for large orchestra, premiered 1987 London BBC Symphony Orchestra
Un segreto d'importanza, ovvero La faticosa vecchiaia di Wolfgang Amadeus Mozart, opera buffa in 1 act to a libretto by Lorenzo Arruga, premiered 6 March 1992, Opéra de Monte-Carlo
Missa de beatificatione in onore di Padre Pio da Pietrelcina, Mass for the beatification of Pio of Pietrelcina, premiered 2 May 1999, Vatican City, Sala Nervi
Passio et Resurrectio, cantata for solo voices, chorus and orchestra, premiered 13 April 2000, Cattedrale di San Giustino, Chieti.
Romanza, una favola romana, opera in three acts to a libretto by Egale Cerroni, premiered 21 November 2002, Opera di Roma
Symphony No. 2 "Andorrana", premiered 2007, Auditorio Nacional de Música, Madrid
Cadens revixit – Vita nuova di Paolo di Tarso, oratorio to a libretto by Roberto Mussapi, premiered 2009 at San Paolo fuori le Mura in Rome .

Notable performers of Rendine's works
Performers of Rendine's works include: 
"Alleluia", Messa per la Pace, Nobel Peace Prize Concert, Oslo 1995: Vladimir Ashkenazy (conductor) and Milva (vocal soloist)
World premiere of Missa de beatificatione in onore di Padre Pio da Pietrelcina, 1999: José Carreras (tenor soloist)
World premiere of Romanza, una favola romana, 2002: Will Humburg (conductor), Amii Stewart (Maria), and Vittorio Grigolo (Aniel)
World premiere of Orlando (ballet), 1997: Carla Fracci (Orlando)
World premiere of Alice (ballet), 1988: Lindsay Kemp (choreographer and dancer)
World premiere of Un segreto d'importanza. 1992: Gianluigi Gelmetti (conductor)
Gala concert for the 50th birthday of Sergio Rendine, 2004: Michele Campanella (pianist) and Katia Ricciarelli (soprano)
World premiere of Ludwig, 2004: Daniele Gatti (conductor)

Notes and references

External links
 Official website
 Sergio Rendine on the official website of Casa Ricordi
Crisigiovanni, Paola, Sergio Rendine, ovvero il coraggio della musica, Editoriale Pantheon
Naxos Records, Sergio Rendine Biography
Enciclopedia Treccani 

Living people
1954 births
Italian classical composers
Italian male classical composers
20th-century classical composers
21st-century classical composers
Italian opera composers
Male opera composers
Musicians from Naples
20th-century Italian composers
21st-century Italian musicians
Accademia Nazionale di Santa Cecilia alumni
20th-century Italian male musicians
21st-century Italian male musicians